Klahim (lit. Corncobs) is a moshav in southern Israel. Located in the north-western Negev near Netivot, it falls under the jurisdiction of Merhavim Regional Council.

History

The moshav was established in 1954 by Jewish immigrants and refugees from Iran, Morocco and Tunisia. It was initially called Shoval Daled and then Shadma, before adopting its current name.

References

External links
Klahim Negev Information Centre

Moshavim
Agricultural Union
Populated places established in 1954
Populated places in Southern District (Israel)
1954 establishments in Israel
Iranian-Jewish culture in Israel
Moroccan-Jewish culture in Israel
Tunisian-Jewish culture in Israel